Neu! 4 is the fourth and final studio album by krautrock band Neu!, released in October 1995. It was revised and re-released as Neu '86 in 2010.

Recording 
Neu! 4 was recorded and mixed between October 1985 and April 1986 at Grundfunk Studio and Dingerland-Lilienthal Studio in Düsseldorf, Germany, and Michael Rother Studio in Forst, Germany. This was the first time Rother and Klaus Dinger had entered a studio together since 1975. However, the sessions were not completed and the planned album was abandoned.

Release 
During the 1990s, the first three Neu! albums were available on CD on Germanofon Records, a dubious label allegedly based in Luxembourg who specialized in unauthorized and illegal reissues of otherwise unavailable krautrock albums.  Germanofon managed to get a number of their releases, including the three Neu! albums, into mainstream distribution. According to Rother's account, Dinger released Neu! 4 "in an act of despair, so he says" in late 1995 as a response to the bootlegs, which Dinger railed against in the liner notes. Neu! 4 was issued by the Japanese label Captain Trip Records, without Rother's input, knowledge or consent. He only learned what had happened in a telegram congratulating him on the release of the album. Rother, writing in March 2007, described this experience as "a rather painful disaster between Klaus Dinger and myself".

The release of Neu! 4 exacerbated the disagreements between Rother and Dinger, which prevented an official CD release of the first three Neu! albums until 2001. The 2000 agreement between Rother and Dinger which led to the CD releases on Astralwerks in the U.S. and Grönland Records in the UK and Europe called for Neu! 4 to be recalled, and it has been out of print since then.

Despite Rother's continued objection to Dinger's original decision to release Neu! 4 and his oft-stated opinion "that [Neu! 4] isn't a legal/real Neu! album", Rother had no objection to fans buying the CD secondhand and would always leave open the possibility that Neu! 4 could be reissued legally with his consent in the future. Rother and Dinger did attempt to negotiate such a release after the official reissue of the first three albums. In March 2007, Rother termed the failure to reach such an agreement "unfortunate". With Dinger's death in 2008, such an agreement seemed unlikely.

Neu! '86 
In early 2010, Rother announced that he had arrived at an agreement arranged with Dinger's heir, Miki Yui, and had completely remastered the album from original multitrack and master tapes to produce Neu! '86, which he termed "our fourth studio album".

The new album shared several tracks in common with the original release, but contained several new or remixed tracks.

Track listing

Neu! 4 (1995) 

Tracks 4, 6, 7, 8 and 14 were selected by Klaus Dinger from "(then) waste material" and other tracks are from "compilation 4 from 27. April [19]86".

Neu! '86 (2010)

Personnel

Neu! 4
Neu!
 Klaus Dinger and Michael Rother – producer, recording, mixing, performer, programming
 Klaus Dinger – voice, guitar, OB8, mix, drums, percussion, programs, other stuff
 Michael Rother – Fairlight, synthesizer, guitar, bass, voice, programs, other stuff

Additional personnel
 Gigi – drums (6, 13)
 Konrad – bass (5, 6, 13)
 Jochen and Brigit – voices (12)

Technical credits
 Michael Grund – engineer
 Klaus Dinger – artwork, editing
 Klaus Dinger and Ken Matsutani – front cover
 Thomas Dinger, Klaus Dinger – original photography
 The Editor (Klaus Dinger) – liner notes

Neu! '86
Neu!
 Klaus Dinger and Michael Rother - producer, recording, mixing, performer, programming
 Klaus Dinger – vocals, drums, guitar, keyboards
 Michael Rother – guitar, bass, keyboards, Fairlight Music Computer, remix

Additional personnel
 Georg Sessenhausen - drums (3, 4, 8, 11)
 Michael Grund – bass, percussive sounds (8)
 Jochen and Brigit – voices (5)

Technical credits
 Michael Grund – engineer (basic recordings of tracks 3-5, 7, 8)
 Michael Rother – rework of original master and multi-track tapes (July–December 2009)
 Tom Meyer – mastering (Master and Servant, Hamburg, January 2010)
 Klaus Dinger – original artwork front cover
 Walter Schönauer, Miki Yui, Michael Rother – adaptation album artwork 2010
 Michael Rother – Polaroid and Grundfunk studio view
 Klaus Dinger – drawing
 la.dusseldorf.de – portraits from video stills

Release history

References

External links 
 Rother, Michael. Michael Rother forum.  Retrieved August 16, 2007.
 Prog Archive Neu! 4.  Retrieved August 17, 2007.

1995 albums
Neu! albums

el:Neu! 4